An esophageal stent is a stent (tube) placed in the esophagus to keep a blocked area open so the patient can swallow soft food and liquids.  They are effective in the treatment of conditions causing intrinsic esophageal obstruction or external esophageal compression.  For the palliative treatment of esophageal cancer most esophageal stents are self-expandable metallic stents.  For benign esophageal disease such as refractory esophageal strictures, plastic stents are available.  Common complications include chest pain, overgrowth of tissue around the stent and stent migration.

Esophageal stents are placed using endoscopy when after the tip of the endoscope is positioned above the area to be stented, then guidewire is passed through the obstruction into the stomach. The endoscope is withdrawn and using the guidewire with either fluoroscopic or endoscopic guidance the stent is passed down the guidewire to the affected area of the esophagus and deployed.  Finally the guidewire is removed and the stent is left to fully expand over the next 2–3 days.

In one study of 997 patients who had self-expanding metal stents for malignant esophageal obstruction it was found that esophageal stents were 95% effective.

Additional images

References

External links
 Esophageal stent entry in the public domain NCI Dictionary of Cancer Terms

Surgical oncology
Implants (medicine)
Medical devices